Profanity is a text mode instant messaging interface that supports the XMPP protocol. It supports Linux, macOS, Windows (via Cygwin or WSL), FreeBSD, and Android (via Termux).

Packages are available in Debian, Ubuntu and Arch Linux distributions.

Features include multi-user chat, desktop notifications, Off The Record  and OMEMO message encryption.

References

External links 
 
 Linux Format Issue 164 Hotpicks

Free XMPP clients
Free instant messaging clients
Instant messaging clients for Linux